Fortuna (Spanish for "Fortune"; Wiyot: Vutsuwitk Da'l) is a city on the northeast shore of the Eel River, approximately  from where it enters the Pacific Ocean, and is on U.S. Route 101 in west-central Humboldt County, California, United States. The population was 12,516 at the 2020 census, up from 11,926 at the 2000 census.

History

The settlement was originally called "Slide," for Slide Hill, in 1874, named for the slide that was a fixture on the northeast side of the Eel River and the southwest portion of Christian Ridge just to the northwest, near the edge of town. In 1875, the name was changed to Springville during the construction of the Springville Mill, a lumber mill for the nearby redwood forests, named so because of the numerous springs in the area. The mill's owners were Henry Rohner (namesake of neighboring Rohnerville), Alexander Masson, M. N. Weber and G. F. Gushaw. Springville was originally a company town belonging to the mill, and the few people that resided there all worked at the mill. By the late 1870s Springville had grown enough to warrant a post office, but a town called Springville, California (now part of Camarillo, in Ventura County) already existed in the state. The post office was named Slide on May 24, 1876. In 1884 the residents petitioned the state legislature for the name Fortuna, Spanish for "fortune" and Latin for "chance," and by July 3, 1888, the change was official. The name was chosen when settlers saw the proximity of the forests, the river and its valley, and the Pacific Ocean, as ideal for enjoying a good quality of life, and felt "fortunate" to live there. It is believed that a local minister and real estate agent, desiring to sell lots to newcomers, devised the name as a marketing tool.

Electricity came to Fortuna in 1883 when W. J. Swortzel and George W. Williams (of Swortzel & Williams), owners of the Springville Mill Company, built a $4,000 power plant. Some of the local sawmills were already powered by electricity, and by providing power to the mills, Swortzel and Williams saw the opportunity to also provide inexpensive electric lighting to the townspeople.

The town was incorporated on February 20, 1906, and, because of the Eel River, became known for its agricultural prowess in vegetable crops, berries and fruits, and for the fresh fish from the river. Although agricultural industry was expanding, the lumber industry is what started the town, and would continue as the main source of local income for some time to come.

Rohnerville (formerly Eel River Township), a town founded to service the many gold miners inhabiting the mountains to the north and east, was competing with Fortuna to be the leading township in the area. The miners would come by ship to Eureka, and then head up the Eel River to the junction with the Van Duzen River, from whence the miners headed east up the Van Duzen River Valley  into Trinity County. Rohnerville was at this junction, and looked to prosper from selling supplies to the miners. But when it was decided that the railroad would be routed through neighboring Fortuna, it set the fate of both towns.

The Eel River and Eureka Railroad was built in 1884 to provide Humboldt Bay shipping access to the lumber mills and farms of the lower Eel River. Atchison, Topeka and Santa Fe Railway reorganized Fortuna's railroad as the San Francisco and Northwestern Railway in 1903, and then completed the Northwestern Pacific Railroad to San Francisco in 1914. Fortuna became the rail hub for smaller communities like Alton, Fernbridge, Ferndale, Hydesville, Newburg, Port Kenyon, Rohnerville, and Waddington.

Since Fortuna's earliest days in the 1800s, its nickname has been "The Friendly City."

Geography

The community is affected by coastal weather patterns with the Pacific Ocean to the west. Fortuna is served by U.S. Route 101 providing direct access to San Francisco  to the south, and to Eureka (the county seat)  to the north. The western terminus of California State Route 36 intersects U.S. Route 101  just south of the city limits. Fortuna is surrounded by national, state and county redwood parks, and is the gateway to the redwood forests of Northern California. The  Avenue of the Giants offers views of the area's redwoods, and carries visitors through a number of groves. Stops include Founders Grove, the Visitor Center near Weott and several locations that provide trail access.

Climate

The area sees summers that are not as foggy as Eureka and Arcata to the north, and run a few degrees warmer.
Fortuna has a warm-summer Mediterranean climate (Köppen Csb) typical of the North Coast that is characterized by warm (but not hot), dry summers, and mild to chilly, rainy winters.

Demographics

2010
At the 2010 census Fortuna had a population of 11,926. The racial makeup of Fortuna was 9,686 (81.2%) White, 73 (0.6%) African American, 444 (3.7%) Native American, 106 (0.9%) Asian, 9 (0.1%) Pacific Islander, 1,065 (8.9%) from other races, and 543 (4.6%) from two or more races. Hispanic or Latino of any race were 2,032 persons (17.0%).

The census reported that 11,665 people (97.8% of the population) lived in households, 189 (1.6%) lived in non-institutionalized group quarters, and 72 (0.6%) were institutionalized.

There were 4,688 households, 1,509 (32.2%) had children under the age of 18 living in them, 2,135 (45.5%) were heterosexual married couples living together, 579 (12.4%) had a female householder with no husband present, 279 (6.0%) had a male householder with no wife present.  There were 363 (7.7%) unmarried heterosexual partnerships, and 38 (0.8%) homosexual married couples or partnerships. 1,368 households (29.2%) were one person and 683 (14.6%) had someone living alone who was 65 or older. The average household size was 2.49.  There were 2,993 families (63.8% of households); the average family size was 3.06.

The age distribution was 2,937 people (24.6%) under the age of 18, 1,192 people (10.0%) aged 18 to 24, 2,681 people (22.5%) aged 25 to 44, 3,050 people (25.6%) aged 45 to 64, and 2,066 people (17.3%) who were 65 or older.  The median age was 38.1 years. For every 100 females, there were 93.1 males.  For every 100 females age 18 and over, there were 89.7 males.

The homeowner vacancy rate was 1.7%; the rental vacancy rate was 6.2%.  6,821 people (57.2% of the population) lived in owner-occupied housing units and 4,844 people (40.6%) lived in rental housing units.

2000
At the 2000 census there were 10,497 people in 4,185 households, including 2,778 families, in the city. The racial makeup of the city was 88.4% White, 0.5% Black or African American, 2.9% Native American, 1.0% Asian, 0.2% Pacific Islander, 4.0% from other races, and 3.2% from two or more races.  10.5% of the population were Hispanic or Latino of any race.
Of the 4,185 households 31.9% had children under the age of 18 living with them, 49.6% were married couples living together, 12.3% had a female householder with no husband present, and 33.6% were non-families. 28.1% of households were one person and 14.1% were one person aged 65 or older.  The average household size was 2.45 and the average family size was 2.98.

The age distribution was 26.0% under the age of 18, 8.6% from 18 to 24, 25.7% from 25 to 44, 22.3% from 45 to 64, and 17.3% 65 or older.  The median age was 38 years. For every 100 females, there were 91.4 males.  For every 100 females age 18 and over, there were 87.8 males.

The median household income was $31,129 and the median family income  was $38,867. Males had a median income of $32,414 versus $23,327 for females. The per capita income for the city was $16,574.  About 12.1% of families and 17.4% of the population were below the poverty line, including 24.8% of those under age 18 and 4.6% of those age 65 or over.

Economy

According to a 2008 Comprehensive Annual Financial Report, the top employers in the city were the City of Fortuna, Eel River Disposal, Fortuna Motors (now defunct), Fortuna Union Elementary School District, Fortuna Union High School District, Redwood Memorial Hospital, Rohnerville School District, Safeway, St. Luke Healthcare and Rehabilitation Center and Wendt Construction.

Education
Fortuna is served by the Fortuna Elementary School District and the Fortuna Union High School.

Government

Culture

The city has a large number of events and festivals, including the Daffodil Festival, Art & Wine in the Park, the Annual Fortuna Rodeo, the Redwood AutoXpo, the Logging Competition, Civil War Days, and Apple Harvest, the Hops in Humboldt festival, the  Fortuna Concert Series and holiday events including concerts and parades with performances by Scotia Band Brass Choir and Saxophone Quartet. Additionally, the Eel River was the locale for the Paddle to the Headwaters canoe race.

Notable people

Jean Buckley, center fielder in the All-American Girls Professional Baseball League
John A. Campbell, timber executive and president of the Pacific Lumber Company
Reggie Christiansen, American college baseball coach
Jon Crosby, American musician and founder of VAST
Cecelia Holland, historical novelist
Randy Niemann, major league baseball player, major league baseball coach
Sam Reynolds, professional soccer player
Ryan Villopoto, professional supercross and motocross champion; born in Fortuna

References

External links

Fortuna Website – archived 2005-07-19
Fortuna Chamber of Commerce
Humboldt Sentinel

 
Cities in Humboldt County, California
Incorporated cities and towns in California
1874 establishments in California
Populated places established in 1874